Alī ibn Muḥammad ibn al-Riḍā ibn Muḥammad al-Ḥusaynī al-Musāwī al-Ṭūsī, also known as Ibn al-Sharīf Dartarkhwān al-Ādhilī (b. 589 AH/1193 CE in Ḥamāh, Syria; d. 655 AH/1257 CE), was a poet. He is noted as the author of the Alf jāriyah wa-jāriyah ('one thousand and one slave-women'), which survives in one manuscript of 255 folios, now in the Austrian National Library. The work seems to have been a sequel to the same author's Alf ghulām wa-ghulām ('one thousand and one male slaves'), now lost; Alf jāriyah wa-jāriyah comprises eight chapters of short poems in the epigrammatic form known as maqṭū (pl. maqāṭī).

Examples
The following examples come from the sixth chapter of Alf jāriyah wa-jāriyah, in which each three-verse epigram celebrates the women of a different city of the Islamic world. This example is in the sarīʿ metre:

This is in the wāfir metre:

Editions and translations 
No edition of the whole work exists, but editions and translations of numerous poems or sections have been published by Jürgen W. Weil. The most prominent publication is his Mädchennamen — verrätselt. Hundert Rätsel-epigramme aus dem adab-Werk Alf ǧāriya wa-ǧāria (7./13.Jh.), Islamkundliche Untersuchungen, 85 (Berlin: Klaus-Schwarz-Verlag, 1984), which published chapter 3 of the work in transliterated Arabic and in German translation. Other editions and translations include:

 Weil, J. W. and A. A. Ambros, 'Tausend und ein Mädchen: aus den Schätzen der österreichischen Nationalbibliothek', Bustan, 4 (1969), 22-28
 Weil, J. W., 'Einige Rätsel aus der arabischen schönen Literatur', Bustan, 2-3 (1970), 47–49.
 Weil, J. W., 'Epigramme auf Musikerinnen (in den letzten zwei Teilen: Künsterinnen in der Gedichtsammlung Alf ǧāriya wa ǧāriya', Rooznik Orientalistyczny, 37, pp. 9–12; 39, pp. 137–41; 40, pp. 83–93.
 Weil, Jürgen W, 'Einige Edelmetalle und Edelsteine als Rätsel-namen in der Gedichtsammlung Alf ǧāriya wa-ǧāriya', Wiener Zeitschrift für die Kunde des Morgenlandes, 65-66 (1973–74), 151–54.
 Weil, Jürgen W., 'Einige Rätsel aus dem adab-Werk Alf ǧāriya wa-ǧāriya', Der Islam: Zeitschrift für Geschichte und Kultur des Islamischen Orients, 55 (1978), 99–101.
 Weil, J. W., and A. A. Ambros, '22 Rätsel-Epigramme aus der Gedichtsammlung Alf ǧāriya wa-ǧāriya', Orientalia hispanica: Festschrift F. M. Pareja, vol. 1, pp. 20–32.
 Weil, J. W., 'Alf ǧāriya wa-ǧāriya, sechstes Kapitel: Epigramme auf Mädchen aus Orten der muslimischen Geographie' parts 1 and 2 in Islam, part 3 in Rocznik Orientalistyczny.
 Jürgen W. Weil, 'Epigramme auf Künstlerinnen in der Gedichtsammlung Alf ǧāriya wa-ǧāriya (Teil II)', Rocznik orientalistyczny, 39, 137–41.
 Jürgen W. Weil, 'Mädchen aus der muslimischen Geographie Wortspiele mit Ortsnamen in einem adab-Werk des 13. Jahrhunderts', Zeitschrift der Deutschen Morgenländischen Gesellschaft, 134 (1984), 269-73
 Weil, Jürgen W., 'Girls from Morocco and Spain: Selected Poems from an adab Collection of Poetry', Archiv Orientální, 52 (1984), 36–41. 
 Weil, Jürgen W., 'Zweimal Butayna: Zum Reflex eines Liebespaares in einer späteren adab-Gedichtsammlung', Der Islam: Zeitschrift für Geschichte und Kultur des Islamischen Orients, 61 (1984), 319. 
 Weil, Jürgen W., 'Miscella corneliana: fünf Epigramme aus dem späten adab', Wiener Zeitschrift für die Kunde des Morgenlandes, 82 [in memoriam Anton C. Schaendlinger] (1992), 445–48.

References 

1193 births
1257 deaths
Arabic anthologies
13th-century Arabic books
Medieval Arabic poets
People from Hama